Father Sergius is a 1978 Soviet drama film directed by Igor Talankin based on the posthumously published 1911 short story of the same name by Leo Tolstoy.

Plot
Prince Stepan Kasatsky, an officer, ardent, proud young man is a big admirer of the king. Kasatsky is about to get married, but at the last moment learns from the bride that she was the mistress of the emperor. The prince is deeply disappointed in secular life, he takes a monastic vow and leaves the capital. Faith in God was supposed to save his soul, but passions and worldly temptations do not leave Kasatsky.

Father Sergius (Kasatsky's new name) leads the hermit's way of life, strictly adhering to order and pacifying the flesh. Deciding that this is not enough - he decides to leave the monastery. He becomes a recluse and starts to live in a cave. Rumors about a former handsome officer who took tonsure, reach a group of people who are resting nearby the monk's cave. A beautiful depraved woman tries to seduce him, and Father Sergius has to cut off his finger to avoid succumbing to her charms. More time passes, and he still does not manage to avoid sin. The feeble-minded daughter of a local merchant, who was led to the hermit for prayer therapy, seduces the monk.

Father Sergius leaves the monastic cell, takes a knapsack and goes off to wander and beg.

Cast
Sergei Bondarchuk as Stepan Kasatsky / Father Sergius
Valentina Titova as Maria Korotkova
Vladislav Strzhelchik as Nicholas I of Russia
Nikolai Gritsenko as General Korotkov, husband of Maria
Boris Ivanov  as hegumen
Ivan Lapikov  as old man on the ferry
Ivan Solovyov as Reverend Nicodemus
Lyudmila Maksakova as Daria Makovkina
Georgi Burkov as a merchant
Olga Anokhina as Maria, the daughter of a merchant
Alla Demidova as Pashenka
Dima Streltsov as Cadet Stepan of Kasatsky
Alyosha Proskuryakov as little Stevenka
Sasha Levchenko as little Pashenka
Irina Skobtseva as Baroness at the Ball
Alexander Dick as The Marquis
Aleksandr Belyavsky as master on the ferry
Katya Bystrova as daughter of Maria
Nikolai Gorlov as father of Nicodemus
Vatslav Dvorzhetsky as Director of the Cadet Corps
Eduard Izotov as lawyer on Shrovetide
Valentin Kulik as landowner
Alexander Lebedev as monk
Vladimir Mashchenko as Captain Schwartz
Yuriy Nazarov as a man on the ferry
Andrey Smolyakov as novice Alyosha
Arkady Trusov as priest
Svetlana Svetlichnaya as lady (uncredited)
Vladimir Ivashov as episode
Sergei Nikonenko as episode
Natalya Fateyeva as episode
Victor Shulgin as episode
Vladimir Basov as  episode (uncredited)

Awards

All-Union Film Festival (1979)

Sergey Bondarchuk - Prize for Best Actor
Georgy Rerberg - Prize for Fine Decision
Victor Petrov - Prize for Fine Decision
Anatoly Nikolaev - Prize for Fine Decision
Yuri Fomenko - Prize for the Fine decision

References

External links

Soviet drama films
Films based on works by Leo Tolstoy
Films scored by Alfred Schnittke
Films about Orthodoxy
1978 drama films
1978 films
Cultural depictions of Nicholas I of Russia
Films set in the Russian Empire